Dabuqiao Subdistrict is a subdistrict in Louxing District of Loudi City, Hunan Province, People's Republic of China.

Administrative division
The subdistrict is divided into 25 villages and 1 community, the following areas: 
 Nanshi Community
 Longhu Village
 Minfeng Village
 Xinshi Village
 Xingming Village
 Songjia Village
 Zhongyang Village
 Shangyuan Village
 Shengxi Village
 Huashi Village
 Dabu Village
 Xiyang Village
 Nanyang Village
 Shikou Village
 Hejia Village
 Litou Village
 Shihua Village
 Bailu Village
 Jianglong Village
 Quanfeng Village
 Yongxing Village
 Gaoshan Village
 Zhongshi Village
 Gaoqiao Village
 Shuangchong Village
 Shima Village

Geography
The subdistrict is bordered to the east by Gushui Township of Xiangxiang, to the south by Maotian Town of Xiangxiang, and to the west by Dake Subdistrict.

Lishui River, also known as the mother river, flows through the subdistrict. Sun Stream, a tributary of Lianshui River, passes through the subdistrict. Xiyang Stream flows through the subdistrict.

Economy
The local economy is primarily based upon agriculture, commerce and local industry.

Education
 Chunyuan Middle School
 Tao Kan School

Transportation

Railways
Shanghai–Kunming high-speed railway, more commonly known as "Hukun high-speed railway", passing through the subdistrict.

Luoyang–Zhanjiang Railway, commonly abbreviated as "Luozhan railway", from Luoyang City, Henan Province to Zhanjiang City, Guangdong Province runs through the subdistrict north to south.

Hunan–Guizhou railway, commonly referred to as "Xiangqin railway", is an east-west highway passing through the subdistrict.

Xi'en railway travels through the northwest part of the subdistrict.

Expressway
Yiyang-Loudi-Hengyang Expressway passes across the subdistrict.

Roads
There are four roads run through the subdistrict, namely Louxiang Road, Loulian Road, East Ring Road, Shanxi Road.

References

External links
  

Divisions of Louxing District